Peace in the Valley is the 29th studio album released by Irish singer Daniel O'Donnell in 2009.

Track listing

 Peace in the Valley
 Mansion Over the Hilltop
 Far Side Banks of Jordan
 On the Wings of a Dove
 If Jesus Comes Tomorrow, What Then
 Wait A Little Longer Please Jesus (Houser)
 Precious Memories
 If I Could Hear My Mother Pray Again
 Just a Closer Walk with Thee
 A Satisfied Mind
 I Won't Have to Cross Jordan Alone (Charles E. Durham / Tom Ramsey)
 The Church in the Wildwood
 Praying (Houser)
 Where We Never Grow Old
 I'll Fly Away

Charts

References

External links
 Daniel O'Donnell's website

2009 albums
Daniel O'Donnell albums